Dilek Gürsoy (born 1976) is a German heart surgeon of Turkish descent. In 2012, she became the first female surgeon in Europe to implant an artificial heart.

Early life
Dilek Gürsoy was born in Neuss in 1976 to parents, who emigrated in 1969 from Fatsa, Ordu in Turkey to work in Germany as Gastarbeiter. One of her two brothers died during childhood. Her father died from sudden cardiac death as she was ten years old. Her mother Zeynep was an assembly-line worker at Pierburg plant. Dilek was raised by her mother, who had learnt reading and writing by herself because she was not allowed to go to school in her childhood in Turkey. During her preschool time in the kindergarten, she learned the German language, and met a German couple, who served as a guide in the German world and her hometown's society. She was schooled in Martin-Luther-Grundschule for primary i, and then completed the high school at Quirinus-Gymnasium in Neuss. She was the first in her family to go to university, where she focused on cardiovascular surgery. Her future professional career has been always surgery since her childhood.

Medical career
After graduation from University of Düsseldorf, she worked as assistant physician, specialist and assistant medical director. In 2017, she worked in Bremen. Since March 2019, she works as a consultant surgeon and as the director of LVAD program at the cardiac surgery department at the Helios-clinic in Siegburg.

Recognition
After becoming curious about Gürsoy's work, Chancellor of Germany Angela Merkel invited her to a conversation on 21 September 2017. She was named to receive the award "Medizinerin des Jahres 2019" ("Physician of the Year 2019") by the German Medical Club on 18 November 2019 for her achievement as the first female physician in Europe to implant an artificial heart. She was honored as one of the BBC 100 Women in December 2022.

Private life
Gürsoy enjoys to live in her hometown Neuss. She returns to hometown on weekends  when she has to work in another city.

She is a football fan of Borussia Mönchengladbach, is a member of the club and holds a season ticket.

References 

Living people
1976 births
People from Neuss
German people of Turkish descent
Heinrich Heine University Düsseldorf alumni
Women surgeons
German cardiac surgeons
German transplant surgeons
BBC 100 Women